Alonzo Verge Jr. (born October 17, 1998) is an American college basketball player for Apollon Patras of the Greek Basket League. He previously played for the Moberly Area CC Greyhounds and the Arizona State Sun Devils.

Early life and high school career
Verge was born in Aurora, Illinois, and grew up in Hillside and Bellwood. He attended Willowbrook High School in Villa Park, Illinois for his first two years. Verge did not play basketball as a freshman in order to focus on academics. As a sophomore, he averaged 23 points, five rebounds, three assists and four steals per game, leading his team to its first conference title since 1972, but was suspended for the playoffs. Verge planned to transfer to Proviso West High School in Hillside; due to eligibility issues, he instead transferred to Arlington Country Day School in Jacksonville, Florida for his junior season, playing alongside Luguentz Dort.

As a senior, Verge transferred to Thornton Township High School in Harvey, Illinois. He recorded 43 points, 11 rebounds, six assists and five steals in an 81–70 win over Bloom High School at the Class 4A Richards Regional title game. He averaged 26 points, eight rebounds and seven assists per game and was named Chicago Sun-Times Player of the Year. Verge competed for the St. Louis Eagles on the Amateur Athletic Union circuit, playing alongside Jayson Tatum and De'Aaron Fox. He did not have any NCAA Division I offers out of high school due to academic struggles.

College career

Moberly Community College
Verge was suspended for five games during his freshman season at Moberly Area Community College for a violation of team rules. He averaged 20.8 points, 6.1 assists, 4.1 rebounds and two steals per game as a freshman, collecting Second Team National Junior College Athletic Association (NJCAA) Division I All-American and First Team All-Missouri Community College Athletic Conference (MCCAC) accolades. On November 9, 2018, Verge posted a career-high 55 points, breaking his own school record, six rebounds and five steals in a 106–65 win over Kennedy–King College. As a sophomore, he averaged a nation-leading 30.9 points, 8.2 assists, 4.2 rebounds and 2.4 steals per game. Verge set single-season and career program records for scoring and assists. He earned First Team NJCAA Division I All-American honors, joining Eddie Smith as the only two-time NJCAA All-Americans in program history. He was named MCCAC Player of the Year and was a First Team All-MCCAC selection for his second season.

Arizona State

On October 2, 2018, Verge committed to Arizona State. He sprained his right wrist after his season debut and missed three games after reaggravating the injury in practice, as he did not inform the coaching staff of the initial injury. Partially as a result, Verge missed his first 13 three-point attempts. On December 18, 2019, Verge scored a junior season-high 43 points off the bench in a 96–56 loss to Saint Mary's. He recorded the fourth-most single-game points in program history and the fourth-most single-game points by a bench player in NCAA Division I history. As a junior, Verge averaged 14.6 points, 3.5 rebounds and 2.3 assists per game, leading the Division I in bench scoring. He was named Pac-12 Sixth Man of the Year and All-Pac-12 Honorable Mention. Verge declared for the 2020 NBA draft before withdrawing his name and opting to return to Arizona State. As a senior, he averaged 14 points and 3.8 assists per game. Following the season, Verge declared for the 2021 NBA draft and entered the transfer portal.

Nebraska
Verge ultimately withdrew from the NBA draft and transferred to Nebraska for his final season of eligibility.

Professional career
On August 8, 2022, Verge signed with MKS Dąbrowa Górnicza of the Polish Basketball League (PLK). In 11 games, he averaged 18.8 points, 3.4 assists, 4.5 rebounds, 1.6 steals and 3.2 turnovers, playing around 27 minutes per contest.

On January 16, 2023, Verge moved to Greek club Apollon Patras for the rest of the season.

Career statistics

College

NCAA Division I

|-
| style="text-align:left;"| 2019–20
| style="text-align:left;"| Arizona State
| 28 || 9 || 26.8 || .438 || .289 || .737 || 3.5 || 2.3 || 1.4 || .1 || 14.6
|-
| style="text-align:left;"| 2020–21
| style="text-align:left;"| Arizona State
| 23 || 21 || 29.8 || .391 || .333 || .809 || 3.9 || 3.8 || 1.2 || .2 || 14.0
|-
| style="text-align:left;"| 2021–22
| style="text-align:left;"| Nebraska
| 31 || 31 || 28.4 || .456 || .315 || .770 || 4.5 || 5.5 || 1.6 || .2 || 14.5
|- class="sortbottom"
| style="text-align:center;" colspan="2"| Career
| 82 || 61 || 28.2 || .431 || .313 || .771 || 4.0 || 3.9 || 1.4 || .2 || 14.4

JUCO

|-
| style="text-align:left;"| 2017–18
| style="text-align:left;"| Moberly Area CC
| 25 || 13 || – || .558 || .320 || .750 || 4.1 || 6.1 || 2.0 || .2 || 20.8
|-
| style="text-align:left;"| 2018–19
| style="text-align:left;"| Moberly Area CC
| 35 || 33 || – || .488 || .418 || .759 || 4.2 || 8.2 || 2.4 || .5 || 30.9
|- class="sortbottom"
| style="text-align:center;" colspan="2"| Career
| 60 || 46 || – || .510 || .392 || .756 || 4.2 || 7.3 || 2.2 || .4 || 26.7

Personal life
His father, Alonzo Verge Sr., played basketball for Proviso West High School in Hillside, where he earned All-State and All-Area honors.

References

External links
Nebraska Cornhuskers bio
Arizona State Sun Devils bio
Moberly Area CC Greyhounds bio

1998 births
Living people
American men's basketball players
American expatriate basketball people in Greece
American expatriate basketball people in Poland
Apollon Patras B.C. players
Arizona State Sun Devils men's basketball players
Basketball players from Illinois
MKS Dąbrowa Górnicza (basketball) players
Moberly Greyhounds men's basketball players
Nebraska Cornhuskers men's basketball players
Shooting guards
Sportspeople from Aurora, Illinois